Prievidza is a city in the central-western Slovakia. With approximately 46,000 inhabitants it is the second biggest municipality in the Trenčín Region and 11th largest city in Slovakia generally.

Name
The name is probably deduced from a personal name Previd with possessive sufix -ja (Previd's village). An alternative and less probable is a derivation from vid- ( – to see, "previdieť" – to see through), thus "the village which can be seen from all directions", "the village in the thin stand".

Features
As a central city of Prievidza District and Upper Nitra Basin (Horná Nitra in Slovak) Prievidza is a seat for many institutions of regional importance – governmental as well as commercial. Because of relatively high percentage of planted trees, Prievidza is commonly called as the "green city".

Prievidza has 6 boroughs: Staré mesto (Old Town in English), Píly, Necpaly, Kopanice, Zápotôčky and Žabník  and there are three adjoining villages that are an administrative part of Prievidza: Hradec, Malá Lehôtka and Veľká Lehôtka.

History

The oldest settlement
The Upper Nitra Basin was inhabited as early as the middle of the Paleolithic period, as evidenced by the rich paleontological findings in Bojnice and Prievidza. Thousands of artifacts have been discovered, including stone tools, animal bone fossils and fireplace remnants.

The Middle Ages
The first written mention of Prievidza was in 1113, as ‘'Preuigan'’. It was promoted to a royal free town in 1383, on 26 January. This meant that the town obtained privileges such as paying benefits to hold markets, choice of pastor and mayor, building mills, catching fish, the free development of crafts and sale of produce. From the 16th to the first third of the 17th century, the Thurzó family controlled the town. Ottomans approached Prievidza from the south and burned it in 1599, along with other towns in the upper Nitra river valley. In 1666, the Piarists built the baroque church (now known as the Piarist Church) and Monastery, which became a centre of culture and education. During the Kuruc uprising in 1673, Prievidza was burned down again, with fire burning a part of town's archives. In 1870, it had 2,719 inhabitants. Since the end of the 19th century and the beginning of the 20th century, industry started to grow, as the railways to Prievidza were constructed. During World War II, the city was one of the centres of partisans. On 4 April 1945, Prievidza was captured by troops of the Soviet 40th Army. Since the end of the war, the population has grown enormously from 5,000 inhabitants to around 53,000 inhabitants, as industry grew. Prievidza became the home of many miners and workers that found employment in the coal mines, the power station and the chemical factory in the nearby town of Nováky.

Geography
The city is situated very near the smaller but more famous town of Bojnice, actually sharing the public transport system. The valley of the Nitra River, in which the city lies, is surrounded by mountain ranges on all sides, in the west Strážov Mountains, in the north Malá Fatra, in the east Žiar and in the south Vtáčnik. Prievidza is the eleventh largest city in Slovakia.

Climate
Prievidza lies in the north temperate zone and has a continental climate with four distinct seasons. It is characterized by a significant variation between hot summers and cold, snowy winters.

Demographics

According to the 2001 census, the town had 53,097 inhabitants. 96.65% of inhabitants were Slovaks, 0.95% Czechs, 0.48% Hungarian and 0.29% Roma and Germans. The religious make-up was 61.91% Roman Catholics, 29.01% people with no religious affiliation and 2.29% Lutherans.

Education
In the city are placed 12 kindergartens, 8 primary schools or elementary schools and 8 middle schools or high schools consisting of two gymnasiums, one commercial/business academy and five secondary professional schools.

Faculty of Management Science & Informatics University of Žilina has in Prievidza branch providing bachelor's degree study.

Sport
Basketball is the most popular and successful sport in city. BC Prievidza won 2 titles in former men Czechoslovak Basketball League (1989, 1993) and after dissolution of Czechoslovakia 4 titles in men Slovak Basketball League (1994, 1995, 2012, 2016). Volleyball club VK Prievidza won 2 titles (2018, 2019) in top Slovakia Men's Volleyball League. Football also has long tradition in city. Footballers such as Martin Škrtel, Juraj Kucka, Patrik Hrošovský or Dávid Hancko were raised in local football club Baník. From Prievidza are also ice hockey players such as Andrej Sekera or Martin Štajnoch.

Sports teams in Prievidza
Basketball – BC Prievidza – Men Top Slovak league 
Volleyball – VK Prievidza – Men Top Slovak league
Ice Hockey – HC Prievidza – 3rd Men Slovak league
Football – FC Baník Prievidza – 3rd Men Slovak league

Arenas and stadiums
Niké Aréna (3,400 seats) tenants – BC Prievidza, VK Prievidza 
Futbalový štadión Prievidza (7,500/2,500 for sitting) tenants – FC Baník Prievidza 
Zimný štadión Prievidza (2,788 seats) tenants – HC Prievidza

Twin towns – sister cities

Prievidza is twinned with:

 Ibbenbüren, Germany
 Šumperk, Czech Republic
 Luserna San Giovanni, Italy
 Valjevo, Serbia
 Velenje, Slovenia
 Jastrzębie-Zdrój, Poland

See also
St. Andrew's chapel in Kos

References

External links
Official website of Prievidza with information in English
Official website of Prievidza with information in Slovak

Cities and towns in Slovakia
Villages and municipalities in Prievidza District